Brahms is a German surname. Notable people with the surname include:

Albert Brahms (1692–1758), German land owner
Caryl Brahms, writer
David M. Brahms, Brigadier General of the United States Marine Corps
Helma Sanders-Brahms (born 1940), German film director
Johannes Brahms (1833–1897), German composer and pianist
William B. Brahms, New Jersey historian
Fictional characters:
Leah Brahms, character in Star Trek: The Next Generation
Miss Brahms, character from the British comedy show, Are You Being Served?

German-language surnames